Thapangthong District  is a district (muang) of Savannakhet province in southern Laos.

Settlements
 Tha Pangthong
 Ban Nong Ko

References

Districts of Savannakhet province